The 2016–17 Southern Miss Golden Eagles men's basketball team represented the University of Southern Mississippi during the 2016–17 NCAA Division I men's basketball season. The Golden Eagles, led by third-year head coach Doc Sadler, played their home games at Reed Green Coliseum in Hattiesburg, Mississippi and were members of Conference USA. They finished the season 9–22, 6–12 in C-USA play to finish in 12th place. They lost in the first round of the C-USA tournament to Rice.

Previous season
The Golden Eagles finished the 2015–16 season 8–21, 5–13 in C-USA play to finish in a tie for 12th place. Due to an ongoing NCAA investigation into NCAA violations and illegal benefits for players under former coach Donnie Tyndall, they self-imposed a postseason ban for the second consecutive year, which included the C-USA tournament.

Preseason 
The Golden Eagles were picked to finish in 13th place in the preseason Conference USA poll.

Departures

Incoming Transfers

Recruiting class of 2016

Roster

Schedule and results

|-
!colspan=9 style=| Exhibition

|-
!colspan=9 style=| Non-conference regular season

|-
!colspan=12 style=| Conference USA regular season

|-
!colspan=12 style=| Conference USA tournament

References

Southern Miss Golden Eagles basketball seasons
Southern Miss